Ekici is a Turkish surname. Notable people with the surname include:

 Mehmet Ekici (born 1990), Turkish footballer
 Volkan Ekici (born 1991), Turkish footballer

Turkish-language surnames